Hobday is a surname. Notable people with the surname include:

Alfred Charles Hobday (1870–1942), English viola player
Claude Hobday (1872–1954), English double bass player
Ethel Hobday (1872–1947), Irish pianist
Sir Frederick Hobday (1869–1939), President of the Royal Veterinary College
Sir Gordon Hobday (1916–2015), scientist and businessman
Peter Hobday (footballer) (born 1961), English footballer
Peter Hobday (presenter) (1937–2020), BBC presenter
Ralph Hobday (1899–1975), designer of the Brookwood Memorial
Simon Hobday (1940–2017), South African golfer
William Armfield Hobday (1771–1831), British portrait painter